Brown Owl is a suburb of Upper Hutt, located 3–4km from the city centre. It developed slowly from the 1960s

The suburb is located on the eastern side of the Hutt River at the base of the Eastern Hutt Valley Hills and Emerald Hill, with SH2 running right through it. It is bordered by Timberlea to the east (at the intersection of SH2 and Norana Road in the northeast), Maoribank to the south of SH2 at Moeraki Road, and Birchville just past the northern side of Harcourt Park on Akatarawa Road. Tōtara Park can be accessed by foot by crossing the Harcourt Park Bridge at the end of Norbert Street.

Brown Owl is serviced by a small shopping centre on Akatarawa Road and a Caltex service station on SH2 opposite Moeraki Road.

Subdivisions 
Brown Owl is split into three distinctive areas:

The main central part of Brown Owl was mostly developed between 1970 and 1990, and contains all of the businesses in Brown Owl.

On the south-western side of Emerald Hill are four streets which contain houses that offer expansive views across the Upper Hutt Valley. The main street, Sunnyview Drive, regularly contains a Christmas lights exhibition annually in December; many of the residents light up their houses and the street with extensive lights displays. It can be seen right across the Upper Hutt Valley. This area was mainly developed in the late 1960s and early 1970s.

Next to the river and Te Haukaretu Park is the Riverglade subdivision. This modern subdivision, developed between the early 1990s and mid-2000s, contains large executive homes; with many of these homes having views across Te Haukaretu Park towards the Hutt River.

Parks 

There are three public parks in Brown Owl:

Brown Owl Park; Located off of SH2 (access point from Speargrass Grove, Timberlea also), contains some bush and a small trail.

Te Haukaretu Park; Located at the end of Norbert Street next to the Harcourt Park Bridge, this picturesque park runs along the eastern bank of the Hutt River. There is a playground and duck pond located at its southern end, and a large football field at its northern end. It has pedestrian access from SH2. A section of the Hutt River Trail runs through this park.

Harcourt Park; Located off of Akatarawa Road and Norbert Street, Harcourt Park is a large, major park in Upper Hutt. This large park contains a small playground and a large playground, along with a toddler's pool and public toilets at its eastern end. It has a soundstage in the south-western end near the Norbert Street entrance, which is used for small local concerts and events. There is a learn-to-ride cycle track on the park's northern side, as well as many wide lawns throughout the park for picnicking or relaxing. Wellington's Kiwi Holiday Park is located on its northern side off of Akaratawa Road. The Hutt River Trail runs along the western edge of the park. Harcourt Park is a very good spot to witness river terracing. The Gardens of Isengard in the Lord Of The Rings trilogy was filmed in Harcourt Park.

Demographics

Birchville-Brown Owl had a population of 3,519 at the 2018 New Zealand census, an increase of 192 people (5.8%) since the 2013 census, and an increase of 180 people (5.4%) since the 2006 census. There were 1,275 households. There were 1,740 males and 1,773 females, giving a sex ratio of 0.98 males per female. The median age was 38.8 years (compared with 37.4 years nationally), with 690 people (19.6%) aged under 15 years, 678 (19.3%) aged 15 to 29, 1,701 (48.3%) aged 30 to 64, and 450 (12.8%) aged 65 or older.

Ethnicities were 87.7% European/Pākehā, 13.6% Māori, 4.9% Pacific peoples, 5.1% Asian, and 2.4% other ethnicities (totals add to more than 100% since people could identify with multiple ethnicities).

The proportion of people born overseas was 19.1%, compared with 27.1% nationally.

Although some people objected to giving their religion, 57.6% had no religion, 32.2% were Christian, 0.6% were Hindu, 0.1% were Muslim, 0.8% were Buddhist and 2.4% had other religions.

Of those at least 15 years old, 477 (16.9%) people had a bachelor or higher degree, and 552 (19.5%) people had no formal qualifications. The median income was $39,500, compared with $31,800 nationally. The employment status of those at least 15 was that 1,620 (57.3%) people were employed full-time, 393 (13.9%) were part-time, and 111 (3.9%) were unemployed.

Schools 
Brown Owl used to have a school (Brown Owl School), but this school closed in 2002. The nearest primary schools are Maoribank School and Birchville School. The nearest secondary school is Heretaunga College, some 6 km away.

Public Transport 
Brown Owl is serviced by the Emerald Hill – Petone commuter bus service (#110), operated by Metlink.

References

Further reading
 - Upper Hutt City Library Digital Archive item 64/14238

Suburbs of Upper Hutt
Populated places on Te Awa Kairangi / Hutt River